"Heartbeat" is a song by American rapper Childish Gambino. It was released on November 15, 2011, by Glassnote Records as the second single from his debut studio album, Camp (2011). The song was written and produced by Gambino himself along with Ludwig Göransson.

Background
Composer Ludwig Göransson worked on both the album Camp and the single. Göransson is known for his work on television comedy, Community, where Gambino stars as a main character, Troy Barnes. Gambino also said in an interview with Hard Knock TV that part of the last verse on "Heartbeat" was his favorite yet.

Composition
The song uses an electro beat "equipped with pulsating drums and buzzing synth chords". The lyrics deal with themes of breakup, love and sex.

Critical reception 
Katie Antonsson published an article called "Best of the B Sides: "Heartbeat", on a website called RockOnPhilly. She added her own perspective to Childish Gambino's hit single:So, to "Heartbeat." It's the second single of the album (I know! I'm sorry! I just have to talk about this song!) and it's the most intoxicating song Glover's come out with. From the echoey beginning and the solemn piano refrain in the beginning to the stunning drop about 45 seconds in, "Heartbeat" is immediately something unexplored. It has a lot of the feeling and tone of Kanye's "Heartless" from 808s & Heartbreak but we get the rap element that Kanye stayed away from on 808s (808s was an entirely autotuned, melodic album from Kanye. There wasn't an inch of rap on it). Plus the drop in the beginning is mesmerizing. It's not just that the bass is dropped, it's how the bass is dropped. It's elongated, whining bass notes that just drape themselves throughout the song. In fact, everything about the song is really smooth except for Glover's razor-sharp rapping, making that factor all the more delightful.Glover's got good speed on "Heartbeat" that he doesn't demonstrate as much through the rest of the album. But these rhymes are lightning fast, and what's so thrilling about them is how smart, witty, and ironic they are. This song takes several listens to fully grasp the nuances in the lyrics. They're emotionally charged and delivered with enough force that even if half of the lines stand out to a first-time listener, the feeling Glover's trying to capture is so clear.Camp is an amazing album, truth be told. It's alarming, unexpected, and sort of uncomfortable to listen to. Glover really speaks his truth on Camp, whether it's the literal truth in his words or a more figurative truth through the way he says them. "Heartbeat" is the highlight of the album, by far, but even in the opening song "Outside," it's easy to get a feeling for Glover's angst and anxiety. It's artfully done. On November 8, 2013, "Heartbeat" was rated as the third best from Childish Gambino on the Sunset in the Rearview site.

Music video
On February 10, 2012, the music video for "Heartbeat" was added on Childish Gambino's VEVO account on YouTube. It was directed by Kyle Newacheck. Gambino described the video as a "reflection" of how he was feeling when he wrote the song, saying, "This is kinda like the mood of the song. I wouldn't say it's so much a video as much as it is just a mood." His brother Stephen appears at the beginning of the music video.

Charts

Certifications

References

2011 singles
2011 songs
Donald Glover songs
Glassnote Records singles
Songs written by Donald Glover
Songs written by Ludwig Göransson